Ce que j'appelle oubli (What I call oblivion) is a 2011 novel by Laurent Mauvignier.

Plot summary
The book is constituted of only one huge sentence telling the story of a young man killed by watchmen in a supermarket because he drank one can of beer without paying for it. It is based on a real story which happened in Lyon in December 2009.  

It is told as a monologue by a narrator whose identity is not explained but who tell the reader that he knew the dead man and his brother.

Theatrical adaptations
The book was adapted several times on theater, one of them in 2012 by Denis Podalydès for the Comédie-Française. An online representation with the same actor was performed in March 2021 during the closing of the theater due to the COVID-19 pandemic, in the online program named Théâtre à la table.

It has also been adapted for contemporary dance by Angelin Preljocaj in 2013.

References

External links
 Book link on Les Editions de Minuit

2011 French novels